The Lanyu Airport (Tao: Seyseykedan No Sikoki No Irala ) is an airport on Orchid Island, Taitung County, Taiwan. The airport does not support night time flying except for emergency medical services flights.

History
The airport was initially controlled by the military, but is now under control of the Civil Aeronautics Administration (CAA) since 1977. Expansion was made to the airport in which it was completed in 1982. Since 1990, the CAA has initiated a series of development projects for further expansion and improvement of the airport.

Airlines and destinations

Incidents and accidents
 On 13 April 2017, Flight 55571, a DHC-6 of Daily Air, experienced a runway excursion and crashed into a guard rail. All of the passengers and flight crews were safe.
 On 7 June 2017, a DHC-6-400 of Daily Air experienced malfunction nose landing gear. All of the passengers and flight crews were safe.

See also
 Civil Aeronautics Administration (Taiwan)
 Transportation in Taiwan
 List of airports in Taiwan

References

External links

 About Lanyu Airport
 AIP Aeronautical Information Publication TAIPEI FIR eAIP CONSULT NOTAM for LATEST INFORMATION R.O.C. TAIWAN CAA

Airports in Taitung County